Kula Municipality is a municipality (obshtina) in Vidin Province, Northwestern Bulgaria, located in the Danubian Plain about 10 km southwest of Danube river. It is named after its administrative centre - the town of Kula. The area borders on the Republic of Serbia to the west.

The municipality embraces a territory of 291 km2 with a population of 4,958 inhabitants, as of December 2009.

Settlements 

Kula Municipality includes the following 9 places (towns are shown in bold):

Demography 
The following table shows the change of the population during the last four decades.

Religion 
According to the latest Bulgarian census of 2011, the religious composition, among those who answered the optional question on religious identification, was the following:

An overwhelming majority of the population of Kula Municipality identify themselves as Christians. At the 2011 census, 87.5% of respondents identified as Orthodox Christians belonging to the Bulgarian Orthodox Church.

See also
Provinces of Bulgaria
Municipalities of Bulgaria
List of cities and towns in Bulgaria

References

External links
 Info website